Sakuradamon incident may refer to:

Sakuradamon Incident (1860), the assassination of Ii Naosuke, Japanese Chief Minister
Sakuradamon Incident (1932), an assassination attempt on Emperor Hirohito